George Flanagan (born 8 October 1986) is an English professional rugby league footballer who plays as a  for the Bradford Bulls in Betfred Championship.

Personal life
Flanagan was born in Bradford, West Yorkshire, England.

He has a son, George Flanagan Jr., playing for the Bradford Bulls alongside his father.

Career
Flanagan started his career coming through the ranks at the Bradford Bulls through their academy system.

In 2018 Flanagan signed a two-year deal to play for his hometown club leaving Hunslet R.L.F.C. one game into the 2018 League 1 season. He scored 14 tries for the Bradford Bulls in the 2019 season, helping them earn promotion through the playoffs back to the Championship. He scored one of his famous 'show n go' tries in the playoff final to further extend Bradford's lead in the 35th minute against former player Leon Pryce's Workington Town, who had previously done the double over Bradford in the regular season.

Flanagan has received a £250 fine and an eight-game ban for an "attack to the testicles" against Hakim Miloudi during a Championship game on 4 August 2019. He has received another £250 fine and a ten-game ban for the same attack made during a Challenge Cup game on 21 March 2021.  Following this second ban, Flanagan has shared his mental health struggles, stating that he was "enduring the toughest period of his career", and has temporarily walked away from social media due to the backlash on social media over the ban.

References

External links
Bradford Bulls profile

1986 births
Living people
Batley Bulldogs players
Bradford Bulls players
Dewsbury Rams players
English rugby league players
Featherstone Rovers players
Hemel Stags players
Hunslet R.L.F.C. players
Rugby league hookers
Rugby league players from Bradford